Jiezhou or Jie Prefecture was a zhou (prefecture) in imperial China in modern Longnan, Gansu, China. It existed (intermittently) from 892 to 1913.

Geography
The administrative region of Jiezhou in the Tang dynasty falls within modern Longnan in southern Gansu. It probably includes modern:
Wudu District
Kang County

References
 

Prefectures of the Tang dynasty
Prefectures of the Song dynasty
Former prefectures in Gansu
Prefectures of Later Tang
Prefectures of Later Jin (Five Dynasties)
Prefectures of Later Shu
Prefectures of Former Shu
Prefectures of the Jin dynasty (1115–1234)
Prefectures of the Yuan dynasty
Subprefectures of the Ming dynasty
Departments of the Qing dynasty
Prefectures of Qi (Five Dynasties)
Populated places established in the 9th century
892 establishments
1913 disestablishments in China
9th-century establishments in China